Phytomyza stolonigena is a leaf mining fly in the family Agromyzidae, whose larvae burrow into leaves of Ranunculus. The larvae of the fly make characteristic mines in Ranunculus leaves; they mine in the petiole, making single corridors that fan out into the leaf blade.

References

Phytomyza
Diptera of Europe
Insects described in 1949
Leaf miners
Taxa named by Erich Martin Hering